There were two Government of the 26th Dáil, the first formed after the 1989 general election on 15 June 1989, was the 21st Government of Ireland (12 July 1989 – 11 February 1992) led by Charles Haughey as Taoiseach; and the second was the 22nd Government of Ireland (11 February 1992 – 12 January 1993) led by Albert Reynolds as Taoiseach. They were coalition governments of Fianna Fáil and the Progressive Democrats.

The 21st Government lasted  days. The 22nd Government lasted  days from its appointment until resignation, and continued to carry out its duties for a further 29 days until the appointment of its successor, giving a total of  days.

21st Government of Ireland

Nomination of Taoiseach
The 26th Dáil first met on 26 June 1989. In the debate on the nomination of Taoiseach, Fianna Fáil leader and outgoing Taoiseach Charles Haughey, Fine Gael leader Alan Dukes, and Labour Party leader Dick Spring were each proposed. Each of these proposals were lost: Haughey received 78 votes with 86 votes against, Dukes received 61 votes with 103 votes against, and Spring received 24 votes with 138 votes against. Haughey resigned as Taoiseach, continuing to serve in a caretaker capacity.

The Dáil met again on 3 July and on 6 July, but no vote was taken on the nomination of the Taoiseach. On 12 July, Fianna Fáil and Progressive Democrats had agreed to form a coalition government, the 21st Government of Ireland (12 July 1989 – 11 February 1992). The same three leaders were proposed again for the nomination of the Dáil for appointment by the president to be Taoiseach. On this occasion, the nomination of Haughey was carried by the Dáil with 84 votes in favour and 79 against.

Members of the Government
After his appointment as Taoiseach by the president, Haughey proposed the members of the government on 12 July and they were approved by the Dáil. They were appointed by the president on the same day.

Change to Departments

Attorney General
On 12 July 1989 John L. Murray SC was re-appointed by the president as Attorney General on the nomination of the Taoiseach. Murray resigned on 25 September 1991, and Harry Whelehan SC was appointed by the president as Attorney General on the nomination of the Taoiseach.

Ministers of State
On 12 July 1989, Vincent Brady was appointed by the Government on the nomination of the Taoiseach to the post of Minister of State at the Department of the Taoiseach with special responsibility as Government Chief Whip. On 19 July 1989, the Government appointed the other Ministers of State on the nomination of the Taoiseach.

Presidential election
From January to June 1990 Ireland held the presidency of the European Community. The 1990 Presidential election was held on 7 November. Mary Robinson won the election, defeating the Fianna Fáil candidate Brian Lenihan and the Fine Gael candidate Austin Currie. During the campaign, Lenihan was obliged to correct the record on whether he had contacted president Patrick Hillery in January 1982 to advise against the dissolution of the Dáil. Alan Dukes proposed a motion of no confidence in the government. This was debated as a motion of confidence in the Taoiseach and the government, proposed by Taoiseach Charles Haughey. It was approved by a vote of 83 to 80.

Challenge to leadership and aftermath
In October 1991, the Dáil debated a motion of confidence in the government. On 18 October, confidence in the government was approved by a vote of 84 to 81.

On 6 November 1991, Seán Power proposed a motion of no confidence in Haughey as leader of Fianna Fáil. Albert Reynolds and Pádraig Flynn, who supported the motion, were sacked from government. On 10 November, the motion was defeated. 

In the reshuffle that followed, Jim McDaid was proposed as Minister for Defence on 13 November 1991, but his name was withdrawn later that day.

Resignation
In early 1992 Seán Doherty, who as Minister for Justice had taken the blame for the phone-tapping scandal of the early 1980s, claimed on RTÉ that Haughey had known and authorised it. Haughey denied this but the Progressive Democrats stated that they could no longer continue in government with Haughey as Taoiseach.

On 30 January 1992, Haughey resigned as leader of Fianna Fáil. Following a leadership election, he was succeeded by Albert Reynolds who formed the 22nd Government of Ireland.

22nd Government of Ireland

Charles Haughey resigned as leader of Fianna Fáil on 30 January, and Albert Reynolds won the party leadership election on 6 February. The 22nd Government of Ireland (11 February 1992 – 12 January 1993) was formed by the Fianna Fáil and Progressive Democrats parties with Albert Reynolds as Taoiseach.

Nomination of Taoiseach
On 11 February, Albert Reynolds and John Bruton were proposed for the nomination of the Dáil for appointment by the president to be Taoiseach. The nomination of Reynolds was carried and he was appointed by the president.

Members of the Government
After his appointment as Taoiseach by the president, Albert Reynolds proposed the members of the government and they were approved by the Dáil. They were appointed by the president on the same day.

Reynolds did not re-appoint Ray Burke, Mary O'Rourke and Gerry Collins, while promoting critics of Haughey like David Andrews, Séamus Brennan, and Charlie McCreevy into senior ministerial positions. Reynolds also promoted a number of younger TDs from rural constituencies like Noel Dempsey and Brian Cowen, to cabinet position. Bertie Ahern remained as Minister for Finance.

Attorney General
On 12 January 1993 Harry Whelehan SC was appointed by the president as Attorney General on the nomination of the Taoiseach.

Ministers of State
On 11 February 1992, the Government on the nomination of the Taoiseach appointed Noel Dempsey, TD to the post of Minister of State at the Department of the Taoiseach with special responsibility as Government Chief Whip, and Mary Harney as Minister of State at the Department of the Environment, with special responsibility for the office for the Protection of the Environment. On 13 February 1992, the Government on the nomination of the Taoiseach appointed the other Ministers of State.

Constitutional referendums
The Eleventh Amendment was approved in a referendum held on 18 June 1992, allowing the state to ratify the Maastricht Treaty.

In March 1992, the Supreme Court held in the X Case that there was a right to access abortion in Ireland where there was a risk to the mother's life, including from a risk of suicide. The government responded with the Twelfth Amendment of the Constitution Bill 1992, which would have amended the Constitution to prevent a risk of suicide as a ground for an abortion. This proposal was rejected in a referendum. The Thirteenth Amendment and the Fourteenth Amendment were approved, providing respectively that the right to life of the unborn did not limit freedom to travel or to obtain information about services available outside the jurisdiction of the state. These three referendums were held on 25 November 1992, the date of the general election following the dissolution of the 26th Dáil.

Confidence in the government
A tribunal of inquiry into irregularities in the beef industry, referred to as the Beef Tribunal, was established to examine the relationship between successive Irish governments and the beef industry. However, this revealed to the public a substantial conflict of opinion between the two party leaders. At the tribunal Desmond O'Malley severely criticised Reynolds, in his capacity as Minister for Industry and Commerce, for an export credit scheme. When Reynolds gave evidence he referred to O'Malley as "dishonest", the Progressive Democrats left the government on 4 November 1992. On 5 November, Reynolds proposed a motion of confidence in the Taoiseach and the government. The motion was defeated with 77 voting in favour to 88 voting against. Reynolds then sought a dissolution of the Dáil, which was granted by the Presidential Commission and the 1992 general election was held on 25 November.

Resignation and succession
The 27th Dáil first met on 14 December 1992. The Dáil did not successfully nominate anyone for the position of Taoiseach on that day, with Albert Reynolds, John Bruton and Dick Spring being defeated. Reynolds resigned as Taoiseach but under the provisions of Article 28.11 of the Constitution, the members of the government continued to carry out their duties until their successors were appointed. The 23rd Government of Ireland was formed on 12 January 1993 as a coalition between Fianna Fáil and the Labour Party, with Albert Reynolds again serving as Taoiseach.

See also
Dáil Éireann
Constitution of Ireland
Politics of the Republic of Ireland

References

1989 establishments in Ireland
1993 disestablishments in Ireland
26th Dáil
Cabinets established in 1989
Cabinets disestablished in 1992
Cabinets established in 1992
Cabinets disestablished in 1993
Coalition governments of Ireland
Governments of Ireland